Oksana Aleksandrovna Yarygina (born 24 December 1972) is a javelin thrower from Russia. She formerly represented Uzbekistan. She won the silver medal at the 1993 Asian Championships and the gold medal at the 1994 Asian Games, the latter in a career best throw of 64.62 metres (with the old javelin type).

For Russia she competed at the 2004 Olympic Games without reaching the final. Her personal best throw is 64.34 metres, achieved in May 1999 in Krasnodar. From August 2005 to August 2007 she was suspended due to a doping offense.

International competitions

References

External links 

sports-reference

1972 births
Living people
Uzbekistani female javelin throwers
Russian female javelin throwers
Uzbekistani female athletes
Olympic athletes of Russia
Athletes (track and field) at the 2004 Summer Olympics
Asian Games gold medalists for Uzbekistan
Asian Games medalists in athletics (track and field)
Athletes (track and field) at the 1994 Asian Games
Doping cases in athletics
Russian sportspeople in doping cases
Uzbekistani sportspeople in doping cases
Uzbekistani people of Russian descent
Goodwill Games medalists in athletics
Medalists at the 1994 Asian Games
Competitors at the 1994 Goodwill Games